L. montana may refer to:

Limnanthes montana, mountain meadowfoam
Lindernia montana, a plant of the family Linderniaceae
Lophocampa montana, a moth of the family Erebidae
Lophostachys montana, a plant of the acanthus family